Marcas Ó Callanáin (1789–1846) was an Irish poet. He was born at Carheendiveane, Craughwell, County Galway, Ireland and was the elder brother of Peatsaí, also a poet. Educated at the local school, he could speak Irish and English. His most well-known work is the love poem, Máire Brún.

In 1967, Seán Ó Ceallaigh - principal of Craughwell National School - produced an edition of their poems.

Sources
 Filíocht na gCeannanáin, Seán Ó Ceallaigh, Baile Átha Cliath, An Clóchomhar, 1967.
 Galway Authors, Helen Maher, 1976.

People from County Galway
Irish poets
1789 births
1846 deaths
Irish-language writers